Marvell Software Solutions Israel, known as RADLAN Computer Communications Limited before 2007, is a wholly owned subsidiary of Marvell Technology Group, that specializes in local area network (LAN) technologies.

History
The company was founded in 1998 as a spin-off from RND, which was founded by brothers Yehuda and Zohar Zisapel. RND was also the product of a spin-off, from the Zisapel brothers' RAD Group. Eventually, RND was split into two companies - Radware and RADLAN.

In February 2003, the integrated circuit (IC) designer Marvell Technology Group closed the deal to acquire RADLAN Computer Communications for $49.7 million in cash and shares.

California-based Marvell said it would incorporate its mixed-signal ICs with RADLAN's networking infrastructure drivers, interfaces and software modules to make improved networking communications products like routers. Currently, Marvell's product lineup includes read channels (which convert analog data from a magnetic disk into digital data for computing), preamplifiers, and Ethernet switch controllers and transceivers.

In May 2007 Radlan was officially renamed Marvell Software Solutions Israel (MSSI), to complete the integration into Marvell.

The company is located in the Petah Tikva technology  park, Ezorim.

Yuval Cohen replaced Jacob Zankel as chief executive in late 2006.

Technology
RADLAN's core technology, Open and Portable Embedded Networking System (OpENS), provided IP-routed core software coupled with customizable management application, development environment and testing tools.

RADLAN's product lines are divided into three areas of
development: Intelligent Intranet Switching; Intranet Accelerator Engines; Intelligent Network Services.

See also
Economy of Israel

References

External links
 Marvell's Official Web-Site

Networking companies of the United States
Telecommunications equipment vendors
Networking hardware companies
Software companies of Israel